Fahad Rehmani is a Pakistani actor and director in television. He first gained recognition in television series Dhund (2017) and Khalish (2018).

Career 
Fahad Rehmani began his acting career in drama Tere Bina. He got noted for his role in drama series Dhund for TV One Pakistan and Khalish For Geo Entertainment. He also directed dramas Tere Bina with Sami Khan, Neelam Muneer also Shabbir Jan and Mera Haq with Shamil Khan and Zaheen Tahira.

Filmography

Television

References

External links 
 

Year of birth missing (living people)
Living people
Place of birth missing (living people)
Pakistani male actors
Pakistani directors